The 1965–66 Serie A season was the 32nd season of the Serie A, the top level of ice hockey in Italy. Five teams participated in the league, and SG Cortina won the championship.

First round

Final round

External links
 Season on hockeytime.net

1965–66 in Italian ice hockey
Serie A (ice hockey) seasons
Italy